Shearella selvarani is a species of spiders of the genus Shearella. It is endemic to Sri Lanka.

See also
 List of Tetrablemmidae species

References

Tetrablemmidae
Endemic fauna of Sri Lanka
Spiders of Asia
Spiders described in 1981